Vladimir Vasilyevich Bodrov (born 1 April 1958) is a Russian football coach and a former player. He is the head coach of FShM Moscow academy.

Honours
 1977 FIFA World Youth Championship winner with the Soviet Union.

References

External links
 

1958 births
People from Khimki
Living people
Soviet footballers
Russian footballers
FC Dynamo Moscow reserves players
FC Shinnik Yaroslavl players
FC Lokomotiv Moscow players
FC Kairat players
FK Poprad players
Soviet expatriate footballers
Russian expatriate footballers
Expatriate footballers in Czechoslovakia
Russian football managers
Dinaburg FC managers
Russian expatriate football managers
Expatriate football managers in Latvia
Association football forwards
Association football midfielders
Sportspeople from Moscow Oblast